The 4th TVyNovelas Awards, is an Academy of special awards to the best of soap operas and TV shows. The awards ceremony took place on 1986 in the Centro Libanés in Mexico City, Mexico D.F. The ceremony was televised in the Mexico by Canal de las estrellas.

Raúl Velasco and Luis Miguel hosted the show. Vivir un poco and De pura sangre won seven awards, with De pura sangre winning Best Telenovela of the Year. Other winners Tú o nadie won three awards and  Angélica, El ángel caído, and Esperándote won one each.

Summary of awards and nominations

Winners and nominees

Novelas

Others

Special Awards
Recognition to his artistic career: Rafael Baledón
Recognition to his journalistic career: Carl Hillos

Missing
People who did not attend ceremony wing and were nominated in the shortlist in each category:
Humberto Zurita
Luis de Alba
Paty Chapoy (Verónica Castro she accepted the award in position)
Salvador Pineda

References 

TVyNovelas Awards
TVyNovelas Awards
TVyNovelas Awards
TVyNovelas Awards ceremonies